Fanfou is a Chinese microblogging (weibo) website. It was the first Twitter clone in China.

History 

Fanfou.com was founded by Wang Xing with the team that created Xiaonei on 12 May 2007. The website was developed in LAMP stack with Twitter-compatible APIs.

Hewlett-Packard became its first paid customer on June 2, 2009.

It was closed on 7 July 2009 due to censorship in the wake of July 2009 Ürümqi riots. It was reopened on 11 November 2010.

References

External links
 Fanfou website

Microblogging services
Chinese websites
Blog hosting services
Internet properties established in 2007
2007 establishments in China